Blackburn was a large parish in Lancashire, England.  The parish had numerous townships and chapelries, which were administered separately from the core Blackburn area, and became recognised as separate civil parishes in 1866.  The parish formed part of the Blackburn hundred.

The other parishes were:

References
https://web.archive.org/web/20070930225917/http://www.visionofbritain.org.uk/relationships.jsp?u_id=10341826&c_id=10001043

Former civil parishes in Lancashire
History of Blackburn with Darwen